Sergei Lobanov may refer to:

 Sergei Lobanov (footballer), Russia footballer
 Sergei Lobanov (chess player), Russian chess player